Energia-100 is a planned geostationary communications satellite built by the Russian company RSC Energia for its subsidiary Energia-Telecom. The whole bandwidths has been leased to the JSC RTComm.RU subsidiary of Rostelecom. Initially, it was planned to be launched in 2018 by a Soyuz-2.1b/Fregat rocket from the Vostochny Cosmodrome.

Payload
While still based on the USP Bus, the payload is one of the modern high throughput Ka band that offers 100Gbit/s of bandwidth. It has been stated that it is equivalen to 1,500 transponders of low bandwidth band.

See also

 High-throughput satellite – Type of communication satellite.
 ViaSat-1 – A high bandwidth Ka band satellite.
 EchoStar XVII – A high bandwidth Ka band satellite.

References

External links
 RTComm.RU Ka band service 

Satellites using the USP bus
Communications satellites of Russia
Telecommunications in Russia
Proposed satellites
2020s in spaceflight